Hamzalı can refer to:

 Hamzalı, Karakoçan
 Hamzalı, Kulp
 Hamzalı, Orhangazi
 Hamzalı, Şereflikoçhisar
 Hamzalı, Yumurtalık